Sean Gerard Davies (born 15 October 1973) is a Zimbabwean cricketer. He played four One Day Internationals for Zimbabwe in early 1996. He has since moved to England where he captained Wimbledon Cricket Club in the Surrey League and coached at King's College School, Wimbledon.

References
 

1973 births
Living people
Cricketers from Harare
White Zimbabwean sportspeople
Mashonaland cricketers
Zimbabwe One Day International cricketers
Zimbabwean cricketers
Cricketers at the 1996 Cricket World Cup